Trygve Smith (20 September 1880 – 10 November 1948) was a Norwegian tennis player. He competed in two events at the 1912 Summer Olympics.

References

External links
 

1880 births
1948 deaths
Norwegian male tennis players
Olympic tennis players of Norway
Tennis players at the 1912 Summer Olympics
Sportspeople from Oslo
20th-century Norwegian people